As a historical colony of the United States, the Philippine English lexicon shares most of its vocabulary from American English, but also has loanwords from native languages and Spanish, as well as some usages, coinages, and slang peculiar to the Philippines. Some Philippine English usages are borrowed from or shared with British or Commonwealth English, for various reasons. Due to the influence of the Spanish language, Philippine English also contains Spanish-derived terms, including Anglicizations, some resulting in false friends, such as "salvage". Philippine English also borrowed words from Philippine languages, especially native plant and animal names (e.g. ampalaya, balimbing), and cultural concepts with no exact English equivalents (e.g. kilig); some borrowings from Philippine languages have entered mainstream English, such as abaca and ylang-ylang.

Some terms are only used in some regions. Examples are bringhouse (bringing food home from fiestas), which is only used in the Visayas, and haggard (police on motorcycles), which is used only in Visayas and Mindanao.

Words with meanings differing from standard English

Words, expressions or usages peculiar to Philippine English

Words with Philippine origin

This is a list of English words which originate from any of the Philippine languages.

Abbreviations
Abbreviations are often punctuated in Philippine English when they are usually not, and some abbreviations are unique to Philippine usage.

Comparison with other varieties

Where British and American English vocabulary differs, in different circumstances Philippine English favors:
 A usage which is shared with British English, as with cinema (US: movie theater); or pedestrian crossing/lane (US: crosswalk)
 A usage which is shared with American English, as with truck (UK: lorry); or eggplant (UK: aubergine)

British English terms not commonly used in Philippine English 
British English terms not commonly used in Philippine English include:

American English terms not commonly used in Philippine English 
American English terms not commonly found in Philippine English include:

Idioms
There are instances where Philippine English idioms are borrowed from British English as opposed to American English or American English as opposed to British English such as:
 A drop in the ocean (as with UK usage) as opposed to US a drop in the bucket
 Home away from home (as with US usage) as opposed to UK home from home
 Take with a pinch of salt (as with UK usage) as opposed to US take with a grain of salt
 Knock on wood (as with US usage) as opposed to UK touch wood
 Wouldn't touch with a ten-foot pole (as with US usage) as opposed to UK wouldn't touch with a barge pole
 Slowpoke (as with US usage) as opposed to UK slowcoach

There are also instances where British idioms are prominently used in Philippine English such as: actions speak louder than words, an arm and a leg, barking up the wrong tree, beat around the bush, don't cry over spilt milk, it takes two to tango, kill two birds with one stone and steal someone's thunder.

There are also instances where American idioms are prominently used in Philippine English such as: before you know it, call it a day, down in the dumps, get the hang of it, hang in there, so far so good, two peas in a pod and under the weather.

References

Philippine English
Lexis (linguistics)
Vocabulary